Alexandra Beverfjord (born 2 June 1977) is a Norwegian journalist, crime fiction writer and newspaper editor.

She was born in Trondheim, and was educated as social anthropologist from the Norwegian University of Science and Technology in 2002. She has been assigned with the newspapers Adresseavisen and Dagbladet, and with NRK. In 2018 she was appointed editor-in-chief of Dagbladet. Her books include Det bor et barn i mitt hjerte (2009, jointly with Atle Dyregrov and Aida Løver), and the crime fiction novels Kretsen (2010) and Kronprinsem (2012).

References

1977 births
Living people
People from Trondheim
Norwegian newspaper editors
Norwegian women editors
Norwegian journalists
Norwegian women journalists
Dagbladet people
NRK people
Norwegian non-fiction writers
Norwegian women non-fiction writers 
Norwegian crime fiction writers
Norwegian novelists